Lakeview is an unincorporated community in Davidson County, North Carolina, United States.

References

Unincorporated communities in Davidson County, North Carolina
Unincorporated communities in North Carolina